Mountaindale (also known as Mountain Dale) is a locale in the town of Smithfield, Providence County, Rhode Island, United States. The area is currently included in the Greenville, Rhode Island census-designated place and is sometimes referred to as part of Spragueville.

Mountaindale is one of the named villages of Smithfield. Mountaindale was home to the Mountain Dale Hosiery Mill owned by J.P. and J.G. Ray.

It is currently a named place in Rhode Island.

It is named in a political graveyard reference source.

Mountaindale Beach is located in Mountaindale.

References

External links
Mountaindale History
Mountaindale Beach

Villages in Providence County, Rhode Island
Villages in Rhode Island